Černá u Bohdanče (1939–1945 Tscherna bei Bochdanetsch) is a municipality and village in Pardubice District in the Pardubice Region of the Czech Republic. It has about 700 inhabitants.

Gallery

References

External links

Cerna u Bodance